Our Last Spring (translit. Eroica) is a 1960 Greek drama film directed by Michael Cacoyannis and based on the 1938 novel "Eroica" by Greek writer Kosmas Politis. It was entered into the 10th Berlin International Film Festival.

Cast
 Alexandros Mamatis as Alekos
 Jenny Russell as Monika
 Nikiforos Naneris as Dimitris
 Panos Goumas as Loizos
 Patrick O'Brian as Sebastian
 Marie Ney as Norton
 Tasso Kavadia
 Lydia Vasileiadou
 Jane Cobb
 Robin Fife
 Nikos Ignatiadis
 Giannis Voglis
 Nikos Pilavios as Nestor
 Phaedon Georgitsis
 Michalis Nikolinakos
 Paris Pappis
 Nana Gatsi

References

External links

1960 films
Greek drama films
1960s Greek-language films
1960 drama films
Greek black-and-white films
Films directed by Michael Cacoyannis